On August 24, 2008, an Aéreo Ruta Maya Cessna Caravan 208 carrying 10 American aid workers, two Guatemalan aid agency representatives, pilot and copilot en route from La Aurora International Airport, Guatemala City to El Estor, crashed 45 minutes after takeoff. The crash killed all occupants but three aid workers. One of the survivors was Dan Liljenquist, an American businessman and politician. The aircraft went down in a field 60 miles east of Guatemala City after the pilot reported an engine failure and was attempting an emergency landing. The aid workers were members of Choice Humanitarian, a West Jordan, Utah based humanitarian group on their way to the village of Sepamac.

References 

 J. Lara, E. Paxtor, G. Palencia. "Mueren 10 en accidente aéreo" (in Spanish) 25 August 2008
 Associated Press "5 Americans Die In Guatemala Plane Crash" CBSNews 25 August 2008
 "10 killed in Guatemalan plane crash " CNN 25 August 2008 
 "Americans die in Guatemala crash" BBCNews 25 August 2008
 Associated Press "10 Killed in Guatemalan Plane Crash" NEWYorkTimes

External links 

 Aéreo Ruta Maya S.A. (official site)

Accidents and incidents by airline of South America
Aero Ruta Maya crash
Aviation accidents and incidents in Guatemala
Aero Ruta Maya crash
Accidents and incidents involving the Cessna 208 Caravan
August 2008 events in North America